These are  sortable  lists of compositions  and arrangements of music by  Imogen Holst. The first table lists original compositions, the second arrangements and adaptations by Imogen Holst of traditional folk tunes and works by other composers. The lists cover unpublished juvenilia from Holst's early teens to final works completed more than sixty years later. Title formats are those given in Christopher Tinker’s listing of works reprinted in the 2010 edition of ‘Imogen Holst: A Life in Music'. More detailed information about the publication and source materials of the music is included in that volume.

In her role of amanuensis to Benjamin Britten, Holst made numerous vocal and piano scores of Britten's works; these are not listed.

List of works

Voice type key: S= soprano; A= alto; T= tenor; B= bass

Table 1: Original compositions

Table 2: Arrangements

References
Citations

Sources
 

Holst, Imogen
Holst, Imogen